Lost Files is the second compilation album by American rapper YoungBoy Never Broke Again. It was released through Atlantic Records and Never Broke Again on December 23, 2022. The entire project was mixed by Fabian Marasciullo and is the first project from YoungBoy to not include any production or engineering from his in-house producer and engineer Jason "Cheese" Goldberg. It also features production from many prestigious producers such as DJ Swift, Dmac, Drum Dummie, Dubba-AA, Dun Deal, Louie Bandz and Mike Laury. The mixtape marks YoungBoy's eighth and final project of 2022.  The release of the album was presented as a Christmas gift to fans from YoungBoy and his label.

Background 
Despite the release not being backed by any official singles, "HTAFL" was uploaded onto YoungBoy's official YouTube channel under the name of "my happiness took away for life" on April 12, 2018. Additionally, on October 31, 2018, "Temporary Time" was exclusively released on YoungBoy's official SoundCloud page; it was confirmed to be a throwaway track from YoungBoy's December 2018 mixtape, Realer. Disregarding the previously released song, the album consists of exclusively leaked songs which have racked up hundreds of millions of streams on unofficial SoundCloud and YouTube accounts. The album was first announced by RapCaviar through their Instagram after they posted the album's tracklist.

Commercial performance
Lost Files debuted at number 45 on the US Billboard 200 chart, earning 18,095 album-equivalent units (including 369 copies in pure album sales) in its first week.

Track listing

Charts

References

2022 albums
Atlantic Records albums
YoungBoy Never Broke Again albums